Guillermo Durán and Máximo González were the defending champions, but González chose to compete in Houston instead. Durán played alongside Andrés Molteni, but lost in the quarterfinals to Raven Klaasen and Rajeev Ram.

Dominic Inglot and Mate Pavić won the title, defeating Marcel Granollers and Marc López in the final, 6–4, 2–6, [11–9].

Seeds

Draw

Draw

References
Main Draw

2017 Grand Prix Hassan II